Edmund Turges (c. 1450–1500) thought to be also Edmund Sturges (fl. 1507–1508) was an English Renaissance era composer who came from Petworth, was ordained by Bishop Ridley in 155
0, and joined the Fraternity of St. Nicholas (the London Guild of Parish Clerks) in 1522.

Several works are listed in the name of Turges in the Eton Choirbook, which survived Henry VIII's Dissolution of the Monasteries between 1536 and 1541. Turges also has a Magnificat extant in the Caius Choirbook, and compositions in the Fayrfax Boke. A Kyrie and Gloria are ascribed to Sturges in the Ritson Manuscript. At least two masses and three Magnificat settings have been lost, as well as eight six-part pieces listed in the 1529 King's College Inventory.

It is quite possible that his setting of 'Gaude flore virginali' was written with the choir of New College, Oxford in mind, especially since a man by the name of Sturges served as a chaplain in the choir between 1507-08. Its unorthodox vocal scoring for TrTrATB suggests the choral forces found in the college at the time where the boys (16 in total) outnumbered the men (of whom there were likely to have been no more than four).

Works
Selected works include:
Gaude flore virginali
Magnificat
Kyrie
Gloria

References

Date of birth unknown
Date of death unknown
English classical composers
Renaissance composers
Year of birth uncertain
16th-century English composers
English male classical composers